Lady Shore was a merchantman launched at Calcutta in 1794. In 1797, she commenced a voyage as a convict ship to Australia until a mutiny cut the voyage short.

Early career
Lady Shore was launched by James Willcocks, Calcutta, in 1794 for his own account. He was also her master. Lady Shore was admitted to Registry in Britain on 19 January 1797.

Mutiny 
Under the command of James Willcocks, Lady Shore sailed from Gravesend, England in May 1797, with cargo, 58 soldiers for the New South Wales Corps, and 119 prisoners. She sailed under a letter of marque dated 3 April that gave her crew as 35, her size as 482 tons (bm), and her armament as 10 guns. However, she had a crew of only 26 when she departed.

Amongst the prisoners were Sélis and Thierry, French prisoners of war from the capture of the corvette  on 10 March 1796. Sélis had been chief helmsman of the corvette, and Thierry was a pilot. They had already made two escape attempts with fellow prisoners. On 28 March 1797, Sélis and Thierry and six other former escapees were embarked on Lady Shore, bound for Botany Bay.

Once aboard, the French decided that their only means of escape was to seize the ship. To this end, they recruited fellow prisoners, three Germans and one Spaniard. In addition to Sélis and Thierry, the mutineers were Laurèche, Delehay, Malleo, Mallicot, Le Garshe, Lockart, Crippong, Greville, Wolfe, and Jean Prevost (Prevôt). They planned carefully, with each man having a specific task during the takeover.

On 1 August 1797, at 2a.m., the prisoners crept into the sentries' station while the sentries slept and seized the sentries' weapons. At a signal, the shout of "Vive la République!" ("Long live the Republic!"), the mutineers ran to take their fighting positions: one controlled the hatch to the women's quarters; two, the hatch of the quarters where the soldiers slept, threatening to kill anyone trying to get out; two covered the deck and were to shoot any sailor or soldier present there and who would not surrender; two controlled the hatch of the officers' quarters; two were to arrest the captain; two were to seize the three officers on deck and prevent them from giving alarm; and the last one would open an ammunition box, distribute it to his fellow mutineers, and patrol to prevent anyone from flanking them.

Seeing two armed mutineers running about, the chief mate, Lambert, fired and mortally wounded Delehay, but was himself killed immediately. Captain Willcocks attempted to resist, but received three bayonet wounds, perhaps from Prevost. Willcocks died two days later. Soldiers attempted to climb on deck, but the men on the hatches repelled them. The French then proceeded to seal the hatches, disarm the crew, and put Sélis and Thierry in command of the ship. The British officers had to sign the certificate of seizure that was the custom when a prize was taken at war. The French recruited some of their prisoners to help sail the ship: seven Irishmen, Conden, Keaning, Lynch, M'Ginnis, Keating, Kelly and Sheridan; and four Englishmen: Church, New, Deviling and Pyott.

The mutineers elected Sélis Captain and Thierry Lieutenant. Sélis and Thierry wrote regulations threatening death to any Frenchman colluding with the British or talking of surrender in case of an encounter at sea, and any British caught with weapons or fomenting another mutiny; and fifty lashes for anyone speaking ill of the Republic. These regulations were translated into English and posted all over the ship.

On 14 August, around 1p.m., fearing that such a large quantity of prisoners would be difficult to control, the mutineers singled out some of the officers and soldiers (the second and third mates, the lieutenant commanding the army detachment, an ensign, two sergeants, two corporals and two privates); after having them pledge not to fight against France and her allies for one year and a day, the French provided them with navigation instruments and food, and cast them adrift in a long boat off the coasts of Brazil, with their wives and children, as well as four convicts, for a total of 29 people. The long boat safely reached the shore the next day in the afternoon.

Lady Shore then sailed to Montevideo; she arrived on 31 August, hoisted the French colours, and saluted the commanding ship with 11 cannon shots, and the harbour with 15. Initially, the Spanish contested the validity of the capture. They came aboard, removed all the prisoners and arrested the three Germans and seven French. After Sélis and Thierry protested to the Vice-Roy, and sought support from the French ambassador, Laurent Jean François Truguet, the Spanish released the French prisoners. It was not until a French frigate squadron under Captain Landolphe, comprising Médée, Franchise and Concorde, sailed into the harbour, that the Spanish acknowledged their authority over the ship and the prisoners.

Fate
 may have recaptured Lady Shore in 1801.  Corroborating evidence is scarce. There is a general mention that the Royal Navy recaptured her and took her to Cape Town. Lloyd's List reported in June 1801 that Lady Shore and Chesterfield had been recaptured near the River Plata and taken into Cape Town. Her subsequent fate is obscure.

Postscript
The men and women in the long boat eventually made their way to Rio de Janeiro and then to Britain, in some cases via Lisbon.

The Spanish retained the female convicts, distributing them as servants among the ladies of the city. Some of the convict women became prostitutes. Some behaved well and ended up married and settled. Those who behaved in a "loose and disorderly manner" were imprisoned; eventually they converted to Roman Catholicism and reformed their ways.

In November 1799, a Bow Street Officer had arrived in London from Portsmouth with Jean Sanlard, alias Provost, and Jean Baptiste Escala. They had been captured aboard a French frigate in the West Indies. Prevost was arrested for having assaulted and murdered "Wilcox". He was tried and hanged.

In 1804, four Englishmen were captured on board several Spanish vessels. Three turned out to be members of the New South Wales Corps, who claimed not to have been part of the mutiny, and one was Lancelot Knowles. The Spanish authorities held them as prisoners of war at Buenos Aires. They had recently been freed and were being sent to Spain for onward transfer to England when they were captured.

See also
John Black (privateer), gives a more detailed account of the mutiny.

Notes, citations, and references
Notes

Citations 

References
 
Black, John, fl. 1798. An authentic narrative of the mutiny on board the ship Lady Shore; with particulars of a journey through part of Brazil: in a letter, dated "Rio Janeiro, Jan. 18, 1798", to the Rev. John Black, Woodbridge. from John Black, one of the surviving officers of the ship, pdf available online, 5MB, 70 pages
Bladen, Frank Murcot, ed. (1896) Historical Records of New South Wales. (C. Potter).
 
Graham-Yooll, Andrew (2002) Imperial skirmishes: war and gunboat diplomacy in Latin America. (Signal Books). 
 
 
 
 
Taunton, William Pyle, ed., (1810) Reports of cases argued and determined in the Court of common pleas, and other courts: from Michaelmas term, 48 Geo. III. 1807, to [Hilary term, 59 Geo. III. 1819] both inclusive. With tables of the cases and principal matters. Great Britain. Court of Common Pleas. (Printed by A. Strahan for J. Butterworth).
  (in Spanish, mainly about Mary Clark, also known as María Clara Jonson)

Further reading

1794 ships
Maritime incidents in 1797
History of Montevideo
Convict ships to New South Wales
Captured ships
Age of Sail merchant ships
Merchant ships of the United Kingdom
Mutinies